9000 Hal, provisional designation , is a stony background asteroid and slow rotator from the inner regions of the asteroid belt, approximately  in diameter. It was discovered on 3 May 1981, by American astronomer Edward Bowell at Lowell's Anderson Mesa Station near Flagstaff, Arizona, in the United States. The likely elongated S-type asteroid has an exceptionally long rotation period of 908 hours. It was named after the homicidal supercomputer HAL 9000, featured in the 1968 film 2001: A Space Odyssey.

Orbit and classification 

Hal is a non-family asteroid of the main belt's background population when applying the hierarchical clustering method to its proper orbital elements. Based on osculating Keplerian orbital elements, the asteroid has also been classified as a member of the Flora family, a giant asteroid family and the largest family of stony asteroids in the main-belt.

Hal orbits the Sun in the inner asteroid belt at a distance of 1.8–2.7 AU once every 3 years and 4 months (1,216 days; semi-major axis of 2.23 AU). Its orbit has an eccentricity of 0.21 and an inclination of 6° with respect to the ecliptic. The body's observation arc begins with its official discovery observation at Anderson Mesa in May 1981.

Physical characteristics 

Hal is an assumed stony S-type asteroid, based on the Collaborative Asteroid Lightcurve Link (CALL) classification into the Flora family.

Rotation period 

In August 2008, a rotational lightcurve of Hal was obtained from photometric observations by Slovak astronomers Adrián Galád, Jozef Világi, Leonard Kornoš and Štefan Gajdoš at Modra Observatory. Lightcurve analysis gave an exceptionally long rotation period of 908 hours with a high brightness variation of 0.9 magnitude. This makes Hal one of the slowest rotators known to exist. In addition, the body's high brightness amplitude is indicative of a non-spherical shape.

An alternative measurement by French amateur astronomers Pierre Antonini and René Roy gave a much shorter period of 22.68 hours. The result, however, is considered of poor quality by CALL.

Diameter and albedo 

According to the survey carried out by the NEOWISE mission of NASA's Wide-field Infrared Survey Explorer, Hal measures between 3.61 and 4.134 kilometers in diameter and its surface has an albedo between 0.26 and 0.375. CALL assumes an albedo of 0.24 – derived from 8 Flora, the Flora family's parent body – and calculates a diameter of 4.11 kilometers based on an absolute magnitude of 14.1.

Naming 

This minor planet was named after the fictional supercomputer Hal 9000, featured in both Arthur C. Clarke's novel and Stanley Kubrick's movie 2001: A Space Odyssey (1968). HAL stands for Heuristically programmed Algorithmic computer. It is one of the best-known artificial intelligence characters in modern movies. The official naming citation was published by the Minor Planet Center on 4 May 1999. The asteroid 4923 Clarke and 10221 Kubrick were named after the writer and movie director, respectively.

References

External links 
 Asteroid Lightcurve Database (LCDB), query form (info )
 Dictionary of Minor Planet Names, Google books
 Asteroids and comets rotation curves, CdR – Observatoire de Genève, Raoul Behrend
 Discovery Circumstances: Numbered Minor Planets (5001)-(10000) – Minor Planet Center
 
 

009000
Discoveries by Edward L. G. Bowell
Named minor planets
009000
19810503